Nunnery Wood High School is a coeducational secondary school which is located in Worcester, Worcestershire, England.

The school has facilities for Science, English, Music, Art & Design, Languages and ICT. The school's sports centre has an outdoor pitch and an athletics track around a grass football pitch.

History
Following the restructuring of schools in Worcestershire in 1983, the Nunnery Wood Secondary School was renamed Nunnery Wood High School. The school gained Science College status in 2004.

Previously a community school administered by Worcestershire County Council, in August 2011 Nunnery Wood High School converted to academy status.

School performance
73% of students achieved five or more A* to C GCSE qualifications in the summer of 2008. Students in Year 11 had the highest pass rate of all time for the school in the English Language GCSE in 2014, with over 82% of the school year achieving qualifications of A* to C in their GCSEs.

Following an inspection by Ofsted in October 2008, the school was accorded an overall assessment of Grade 1 (Outstanding). The school's most recent inspection as of 2022 was in December 2015, with a judgement of "Good" by the inspectors. The school's science department was awarded the Platinum Science Mark Award in October 2020.

Awards 
3 Eco School Green Flags
Investors In People
Sportsmark And Leading Aspect

Notable former pupils 
Mark Little, professional footballer for Peterborough United and Bristol City.
Phil Porter, British playwright, librettist and television writer.

References

Educational institutions established in 1954
Academies in Worcestershire
1954 establishments in England
Secondary schools in Worcestershire
Schools in Worcester, England